Catalina State Park is located at the base of the Santa Catalina Mountains. It is home to nearly 5,000 saguaros and desert plants. There are 5,500 acres of foothills and canyons that offer opportunities for camping, hiking, and bird watching. The park is home to more than 150 species. At an elevation of nearly 3,000 feet, the park offers miles of trails for recreational use.

Recreation
The park is several minutes by car away from the Tucson metropolitan area. The park is home to trails for activities like birding, biking, backpacking and hiking, including Romero Ruin Trail, Nature Trail, Romero Canyon Trail, Sutherland Trail, Canyon Loop Trail, 50-Year Trail, Birding Trail, and the Bridle Trail.

The park also features several campgrounds and an equestrian center with ample parking for trailers, as specific trails are also open to equestrians.

History

Cultural history

There is evidence that the park and surrounding area have been continuously occupied since about 5000 BCE by the Hohokam people.  The Romero Ruin still contains pueblos built of rock and adobe, as well as a Mesoamerican ballcourt.  The earliest date the pueblo would have lived in the area is between 550–600 CE. The site was widely used for nearly 400 years, estimated around 1000–1450 CE.

The namesake of this ruin, Francisco Romero, built a ranch on the site in the 19th century, and most likely used stone from the previous Hohokam structure to build his house, and fortifications to protect him from the Apache.

Establishment of the Park

Bighorn Fire 
On June 5, 2020, a lightning strike started the Bighorn Fire which burned through the Santa Catalina Mountains until late July. The Bighorn Fire burned parts of Catalina State Park and caused damage to trails and vegetation.

See also

 List of Arizona state parks

References

External links

 

1974 establishments in Arizona
Parks in Pima County, Arizona
Protected areas established in 1974
Santa Catalina Mountains
State parks of Arizona